Mehneh (also Romanized as Mahneh; also known as Maina and Mīnā) is a village in and the capital of Mahvelat-e Jonubi Rural District, in the Central District of Mahvelat County, Razavi Khorasan Province, Iran. At the 2006 census, its population was 2,842, in 744 families.

References 

Populated places in Mahvelat County